Charles Andrew John Morris (born 6 July 1992) is an English cricketer active 2012 to 2014 who plays for Worcestershire. He has appeared in seventy seven first-class forty one List A and thirty two T20 Matches as a righthanded batsman who bowled right arm medium fast.  He took 56 First Class wickets in his first full season with Worcestershire and helped them gain promotion to Division 1 Cricket. He has successfully secured 313 wickets over his career to date

References

External links

1992 births
English cricketers
Worcestershire cricketers
Devon cricketers
Living people
People educated at King's College, Taunton
Sportspeople from Hereford
English cricketers of the 21st century
Oxford MCCU cricketers